The Cazador was a steamboat built 1848 in France and bought 1851 by the Chilean Navy for the transport of military and cargo along the coast of Chile.

On 30 January 1856 Cazador sailed off Talcahuano bound for Valparaíso at 11:30 AM carrying the 2nd Company of the Battalion Maipo and their families. In addition, she carried supplies, horses and guns. She sailed 6 miles from the coast at 9 kn.

At 20:00 the ship was driven on reef off Point Carranza, 10 km south of Constitución.

The sinking of the Cazador resulted in the greatest single-incident maritime loss of life in the history of Chile.

Sources disagree on the number rescued and final death toll. The ship's captain, Ramón Cabieses, in his report gives 23 rescued and 307 dead, but author Carlos López Urrutia gives 400 dead.

After the sinking Captain Cabieses faced a drumhead court martial to determine his responsibility in the deaths of those on board. Public opinion at the time demanded that he be beheaded - however, thanks to his influence, his distinguished service in earlier naval campaigns, and that at the time there were few officials familiar with the coast of Chile, the Chilean Navy commuted his sentence.

References

External links
 Chilean Navy website Cazador, retrieved on 31 December 2012
 Wreck Report for 'John Elder', 1892, also sunk off Punta Carranza

1848 ships
Corvettes of the Chilean Navy
Shipwrecks in the Chilean Sea
Maritime incidents in January 1856
History of Maule Region